Cnuella is a genus of Gram-negative, rod-shaped and non-spore-forming bacteria from the family of Chitinophagaceae with one known species (Cnuella takakiae). Cnuella takakiae has been isolated from the moss Takakia lepidozioides from the Gawalong glacier in China.

References

Chitinophagia
Bacteria genera
Monotypic bacteria genera
Taxa described in 2014